Tracy Lynn Kahn is a citrus scientist, that currently serves as the 11th curator of University of California, Riverside Citrus Variety Collection since 1995, succeeding her master Willard Paul Bitters.

Education & degree
Kahn earned her B.S. degree on Botany from the University of Michigan and her Ph.D. degree on botany from the University of California, Riverside in 1987. She is also a researcher, using the collection to evaluate the commercial potential of new varieties.

References

Scholarly work
 Citrus Variety Evaluation for Trueness-to-Type and Commercial Potential by Tracy Kahn (2008)
 Tried and True or Something New? A catalog of new fruits relative to the old ones, by Tracy L. Kahn and Tony Siebert
 A quantitative and structural comparison of Citrus pollen tube development in cross-compatible and self-incompatible gynoecia by Tracy L. Kahn and Darleen A. DeMason
 Characterization of Expression of Drought- and Abcisic Acid-Regulated Tomato Genes in the Drought-Resistant Species Lycopersion pennellii be Tracy L. Kahn, Susan E. Fender, Elizabeth A. Bray, and Mary A. O'Connell

External links
 Celebrate sunny citrus A report on the activities within the CVC
 Lemons, Yes, but Please! Don't Squeeze by David Karp (pomologist)
 Lemon Field Day

21st-century American botanists
University of California, Riverside faculty
Plant physiologists
University of Michigan alumni
Living people
Year of birth missing (living people)